Sruthy Jayan is an Indian actress who works predominantly on Malayalam cinema. She is also a trained classical dancer.

Filmography

Films
All films are in Malayalam.

Webseries

Short films

References

External links

20th-century Indian actresses
20th-century Indian dancers
Actresses in Malayalam cinema
Actresses in Hindi cinema